Independent Wrestling Association (IWA) Mid-South (also known as IWA Mid-South, IWA-MS, and IWA Mid South Wrestling) is an American independent professional wrestling promotion based in New Albany, Indiana. It was formed by Ian Rotten in 1996.

History

Hardcore wrestling
Independent Wrestling Association: Mid-South (IWA-MS) formed in 1996 in Louisville, Kentucky. The owner, Ian Rotten, is one of the first to bring hardcore style of wrestling to the United States with his feud with former tag team partner Axl Rotten. He formed the promotion shortly after being fired from Extreme Championship Wrestling in the mid-1990s. IWA Mid-South's first live event occurred on January 6, 1996 in New Albany, Indiana. On October 10, they held of the first of what would become weekly shows in Louisville, Kentucky. April 3, 1997 saw IWA Mid-South crowned its first Heavyweight Champion, Tower of Doom, when he won a three way dance in the finals of a tournament.

Move to Indiana
Going into the year 2000, a series of incidents with the Kentucky Athletics Commission forced IWA Mid-South to move its operations to Charlestown, Indiana. In late 2000, IWA Mid-South started to make a slow shift to more technical based wrestlers and matches. During that year Dave Prazak became a featured manager, ring announcer, and commentator. He played a prominent role in bringing in Colt Cabana and CM Punk to join Chris Hero and other technical wrestlers. With this change brought the birth of the Ted Petty Invitational Tournament (TPI), then known as Sweet Science 16. The first TPI was held in 2000 and won by Chris Hero. During this time, a match featuring Punk and Hero lasted 92 minutes and has since been referred to by ESPN's SportsCenter as one of the longest sporting events.

In 2002, IWA Mid-South moved its base to Clarksville, Indiana. From 2003 to 2007, IWA Mid-South ran shows in a wide variety of venues, mostly Indiana and Illinois. During this span, they had a 51-month streak of running at least one show in every calendar month. IWA Mid-South then went on a planned hiatus, restarting operations with their 500th show on March 1, 2008.

On August 26, 2009, IWA Mid-South announced that it would cease its operations after the Kings of the Crimson Mask show on August 28. However, on November 3, IWA Mid-South announced that it would return with smaller budget shows, starting with Chapter 2: In The Beginning on November 20, 2009. On March 28, 2011, IWA Mid-South announced it would end operations immediately.

In July 2011, IWA Mid-South re-opened under new ownership. On September 16–17, 2011 the company returned with its annual King of the Death Match tournament. During that autumn, IWA Mid-South promoted a number of small shows in the Bellevue, Illinois area. IWA Mid-South then closed down once again.

In July 2013, Ian Rotten announced he was once again promoting shows under the IWA-MS banner, this time returning to the old Clarksville Arena. They ran multiple shows there before the building went under new ownership. They then relocated to Jammerz Rollerdrome also In Clarksville. They also ran at The Arena based in Jeffersonville Indiana before moving to the New IWA Arena at the Memphis Trading Post in Memphis, Indiana where they were running two shows a week, Thursday nights and Saturday nights. They then moved to the Axl Rotten memorial hall in Connersville, Indiana until 2021 when they relocated to the new IWA Wrestling Center in New Albany, Indiana where they began to regularly shows. They also ran occasionally in Indianapolis, Indiana.

On June 13, 2022, Heavyweight and Junior Heavyweight champion Jake Crist publicly called out Ian Rotten over not having been paid in a month, and proceeded to set fire to both belts in a bag. Fellow IWA-MS wrestlers John Wayne Murdoch and Satu Jinn announced they would pull out of the upcoming King of the Deathmatch 2022 event in response. The next day, IWA-MS abruptly announced on their Facebook page that all upcoming shows had been cancelled, leaving the promotion in hiatus once again.

Mike Levy incident
On June 21, 2008, during IWA's 2008 Queen of the Deathmatch tournament in Sellersburg, Indiana, Mike Levy, an inexperienced indie wrestler from North Carolina, was booked to face Mickie Knuckles in a semi-finals tournament match. Through the course of the match, Mickie delivered several stiff punches and weapon shots to Mike Levy, even going so far to shoot headbutt Levy so hard that it left her with a lump on her head. Ian Rotten and wrestlers Tank, Devon Moore, and Rotten's then pre-teen son (now wrestling as J.C. Rotten) rushed the ring and legitimately attacked the young wrestler resulting in heavy bleeding. The incident garnered heavy backlash and was investigated by Indiana police, but no charges were filed. According to Rotten, the attack was staged and Levy was allegedly "told upfront he was going to take an ass whooping." Levy is still active in the North Carolina independent circuit.

Current championships

Defunct championships

Tournaments

See also
List of National Wrestling Alliance territories
List of independent wrestling promotions in the United States
International Wrestling Association
International Wrestling Association of Japan

References

External links

Wrestling-Titles.com: IWA Mid-South

 
Entertainment companies established in 1996
Independent professional wrestling promotions based in the Southern United States
American companies established in 1996
1996 establishments in Kentucky

de:Independent Wrestling Association#IWA Mid-South